Pietro Lombardi (4 June 1922 – 5 October 2011) was a Greco-Roman wrestler from Italy. He who won a gold medal in the flyweight division at the 1948 Olympics and placed third at the world championships in 1950 and 1955.

References 

Olympic wrestlers of Italy
Wrestlers at the 1948 Summer Olympics
Wrestlers at the 1952 Summer Olympics
Italian male sport wrestlers
Sportspeople from Bari
1922 births
2011 deaths
Olympic medalists in wrestling
Olympic gold medalists for Italy
World Wrestling Championships medalists
Medalists at the 1948 Summer Olympics
20th-century Italian people